This Is Animal Music is the debut studio album by Look Mexico. The album, which was released July 10, 2007, has been noted by the band's record label as a mature step forward. The band has toured extensively throughout the US in support of the record. The album can easily be noted as a beginning for the band's commercial success, as it has sparked attention among major music news sources and has even got the band featured in Alternative Press as a band to look for in 2007.  The album features guest vocals by Eric Collins of The Dark Romantics (tracks 3, 4, 7) and Nathan Bond of Band Marino (track 7).

Track listing
"You Come into My House, While I Sleep?" - 3:17
"It's Been a Long Time Since I Smelled Beautiful" - 2:52
"I Promise We'll Swing for the Fences" - 3:14
"I Had a Wrench, and I Hit Him" - 3:00
"Watch Out for This" - 2:40
"Dude, You Have a Bazooka" - 2:35
"You Ever Get Punched in the Face for Talking Too Much?" - 2:37
"Me and My Dad Built Her" - 3:39
"I Mean Pushups!" - 1:26
"Not On My Watch" - 2:47
"Done and Done." - 3:02
"Comin' in Hot with a Side of Bacon" - 4:16
"Half That Money Is Mine, and I Want It" - 2:02
"I Like Being A Millionaire. You Will Too, Believe Me." - 4:07

References

External links
iTunes Album Page
Official Site

2007 albums
Look Mexico albums